"I Luv U" is a song by English indie rock group the Ordinary Boys, released in early 2007. The song was taken from their album How to Get Everything You Ever Wanted in Ten Easy Steps and features a distinctive double-bass line. It reached #7 in the UK Singles Chart, and #5 in the UK Download Chart. The video for the song was recorded in an old TV studio, and shot on a vintage Ikegami camera. The video is set in a fictional 1970s style music cabaret. The video was directed by U.K director Nick Collett.

References

The Ordinary Boys songs
2007 singles
2006 songs
Songs written by Preston (singer)